A list of religious books of Shia Islam:

Books of Shia Imams
Mus'haf of Ali, Tafseer Quran by Imam Ali
 Al-Jafr by Imam Ali
 Nahj al-Balaghah, a collection of sermons, letters and quotes of Imam Ali
 Ghurar al-Hikam wa Durar al-Kalim compilation of over ten thousand short sayings of Imam Ali
 Al-Sahifa al-Alawiya (Book of Supplications (Du'a)) by Imam Ali, translated by William Chittick.
 Divan-i Ali ibn Abu Talib (poems which are attributed to Ali ibn Abu Talib).
 Book of Ali by Ali
 Book of Fatimah by Fatimah
 Al-Sahifa al-Sajjadiyya by Imam Zayn al-Abidin
 Risalatul Huquq by Zayn al-Abidin 
 The Fifteen Whispered Prayers by Zayn al-Abidin 
 Dua Abu Hamza al-Thumali by Zayn al-Abidin 
 Ma'athiru'l-Baqir by Imam Muhammad al-Baqir
 Umm al-Kitab by Imam Muhammad al-Baqir
 Tafsir al-Baqir by Imam Muhammad al-Baqir
 Tafsir Imam Ja'far al-Sadiq by Imam Jafar al-Sadiq
 Al-Sahifat al-Ridha by Imam Ali al-Ridha
 Al-Risalah al-Dhahabiah by Imam Ali al-Ridha
 Uyoun Akhbar Al-Ridha, a collection of debates on religious questions and the sayings of Imam Ali al-Ridha
 Tafsir al-Askari by Imam Hasan al-Askari

Hadith collections

Al-Kutub Al-Arb'ah- the Four books 
 Kitab al-Kafi of Kulayni (divided into Usul al-Kafi, Furu al-Kafi and Rawdat al-Kafi)
Man La Yahduruhu al-Faqih of Shaikh Saduq
 Tahdhib al-Ahkam of Shaikh Tusi
 al-Istibsar of Shaikh Tusi

Primary Hadith Collection 
(Primary Hadith books are those books which are collected, compiled and written by author or their students themselves).
The Book of Sulaym ibn Qays by Sulaym ibn Qays
 al-Mahasin by 
 Uyun Akhbar al-Ridha by Shaykh Saduq
 Kitab al-Ghayba by Muhammad Ibn Ibrahim Ibn Jafar al-Numani
 Kitab al-Ghayba of Al Tusi by Shaykh Tusi
 Tuhaf al-Uqul by 
 Khasais of Al Aemmah by Al-Sharif al-Radi 
 Daim al-Islam by Al-Qadi al-Nu'man
 Al-Ihtijaj by 
 Kamil al-Ziyarat by Ibn Qulawayh
 Al Saqib Fi al-Manâqib by Ibn Hamaza Tusi
 Basâ'ir al-darajât by

Secondary books of Hadith 
(Secondary Hadith books are those books which are not collected, compiled and written by author himself but rather they are selected from already existing Hadith books i.e. Primary Hadith books)
Al-Wafi by Mohsen Fayz Kashani
 Wasā'il al-Shīʿa by Shaikh al-Hur al-Aamili
 Bihar al-Anwar by Allama Majlesi 
 Haq ul-Yaqeen by Allama Majlisi 
 Ayn al-Hayat by Allama Majlisi
 Ghurar al-Hikam wa Durar al-Kalim by 
 by Mirza Husain Noori Tabarsi
 by Shaykh Abbas Qumi
 Mustadrak safinat al-bihar by 
 Ayan al-Shia by Al-Sayyed Mohsen al-Amin
 Jami' ahadith al-Shi'a by Hossein Borujerdi
 Nahj-al feṣāḥa by 
 by Mohammad Reyshahri

Hadith's Anthologies & Commentaries
Sharh Usul al-Kafi — by Mohammad Salih al-Mazandarani
 A Bundle of Flowers — collected by Ayatollah Sayyid Kamal Faghih Imani; a popular English language secondary collection of Shi'a hadith. It narrates traditions from such Shia collections as Kitab al-Kafi and Man la Yahdhuruhu'l Faqih.
 A Shi'ah Anthology — by William Chittick, Hossein Nasr and Muhammad Husayn Tabataba'i; a brief introduction to exemplary hadith from the 12 Imams.
 Mir'at al-Uqul (Mirror of the Mind) — by Mohammad Baqir Majlisi is a hadith commentary considered among the most significant commentary on Al-Kafi by the Twelver Shi'a community.

Quranic Tafsirs
List of Quran Exegesis books and related Concepts
Tafsir Al-Qummi by Mohammad bin Ali bin Ibrahim Al-Qummi (?? - 919 AD)
Tafsir Ayyashi by Mohammad ibn Masoud Ayyashi (died 932 AD)
 Tafsir al-Nu'mani by Muhammad b. Ibrahim al-Nu'mani (died 971 AD)
Al-Tibbyan Fi Tafsir al-Quran by Shaikh Tusi (995 AD - 1067 AD)
 Majma' al-Bayan by Shaykh Tabarsi (1073 AD - 1153 AD)
 Tafsir Safi by Mohsen Fayz Kashani ( ?? - 1680 AD)
Al-Burhan Fi Tafsir al-Quran by Syed Hashim al Bahrani (died 1696 AD)
Tafsir al-Mizan by Allamah Tabatabai (1903 AD - 1981 AD)
Al-Bayan Fi Tafsir al-Quran by Abu al-Qasim al-Khoei (1899 AD - 1992 AD)
Fasal Khizab by Mufti Jafar Hussain (1914 AD - 1982)
 by Hussain Bakhsh Jarra (1920 AD - 1990 AD)
Tafsir Nemooneh by Naser Makarem Shirazi (1927 AD - Present)
Faizan Ur Rehman by Muhammad Hussain Najafi (1932 AD to present)
Tasneem Tafsir by Abdollah Javadi Amoli (1933 AD to present)
Tafsir Rahnama by Akbar Hashemi Rafsanjani (1934 AD - 2017 AD)
Al Kauthar fi Tafsir Al Quran by Mohsin Ali Najafi (1938 AD to Present)
 Tafseer e Masoomeen (as) compiled by Wilayat Mission

[Tafsir Hub e Ali]

Theology of Shi'a
These books include discussions about Theology of Shi'a (Usul al-din or principles of religion): (Tawḥīd, Nubuwwah (Prophecy), Imamah, Adalah (Justice of God), Maʿad (Resurrection)), etc.

Classic Kalam
These books seek to give a rational account of Shi'a theology in contrast with the Ash'ari, Mu'tazili and other theological schools of Islam. The contents of these books are taken from the 8th to the 13th century (2nd to 7th century of Islam).
Eʿteqādātal-Emāmīya by Shaykh Saduq (923 AD - 991 AD)
 Al-Amali by Shaykh Saduq (923 AD - 991 AD)
 Al-Khisal by Shaykh Saduq (923 AD - 991 AD)
 Awail Al Maqalat by Shaykh Mufid (948 AD - 1022 AD)
 Al-Amali by Sheikh al-Mufid (948 AD to 1022 AD)
 Tashih al-I'tiqad by Shaykh Mufid (948 AD - 1022 AD), a correction of Shaykh Saduq's Eʿteqādātal-Emāmīya.
 Al-Amali by Shayhk Murtaza (965 AD - 1044 AD)
 Al-Amali by Shaykh Tusi (995 AD - 1067 AD)
Tajrid al-I'tiqad by Nasir al-Din Tusi (1201 AD - 1274 AD)

Modern Kalam
These books seek to give a rational account of Shi'a theology in contrast with modern Western ideologies including Marxism and Liberalism during the 20th century.
Fundamentals Of Islamic Thought by Morteza Motahhari, trans. R. Campbell: Berkeley, California, Mizan Press, 1982.
 Man and Universe by Morteza Motahhari

Ilm ar-Rijal
 Rijal al-Barqi by Sheikh Al-Barqi
Rijal al-Kashshi by al-Kashshi
 by Ahmad ibn Ali al-Najashi
 Rijal al-Tusi by Shaykh Tusi
 Al Fehrist by Shaykh Tusi
 Kitab ur-Rijal by Hassan bin Dawood al-Hilli
 Al Mabani ur-Rijalia by Allama Hilli
 by Grand Ayatollah Khoei

Shia Jurisprudence (fiqh)
List of books about Fiqh Literature and list of books about Hadith Sources
 by Shaykh Saduq
 Sifat al-Shi'a by Shaykh Saduq
 Fada'il al-Shi'a by Shaykh Saduq
  by Shaykh Saduq
  by Shaykh Saduq
 Urwa al-Wuthqa by Ayatollah Mohammed Kazem Yazdi
 by Muhaqqiq al-Hilli
 by Ayatollah Muhammad Hasan al-Najafi
 Madarik al-ahkam fi sharh shara'i' al-Islam by Ayatollah 
 Al-Mahasin by 
 Tawdih al-Masa'il by Ayatollah Ali al-Sistani
 Tawdih al-Masa'il by Grand Ayatollah Hossein Vahid Khorasani

History books
List of History books
The Book of Sulaym ibn Qays by Sulaym ibn Qays (1st Century) (622-30 AD - 709 AD)
Tarikh al-Yaqubi by Ya'qubi (3rd century) (died 898 AD)
 by Al-Masudi (4th Century) (896 AD - 956 AD)
'Murūj aḏ-Ḏahab by Al-Masudi (4th Century) (896 AD - 956 AD)
 — by Shaikh Saduq (4th Century) (923 AD - 991 AD)
Kitab al-Irshad also known as Tazkar-tul-Athar by Shaykh Al-Mufid (4th Century) (948 AD - 1022 AD)
 by Shaykh Al-Mufid (4th Century) (948 AD - 1022 AD)
 by Shaykh Al-Mufid (4th Century) (948 AD - 1022 AD)
 by Muhammad b. Jarir al-Tabari al-Saghir (5th Century)
Al-Luhuf ala qatla l-tufuf (book) by Ali b. Musa b. Ja'far b. Tawus (7th Century) (1193 AD - 1266 AD)
Majalis al-muminin— by Qazi Nurullah Shustari (10th Century) (1542 AD - 1610 AD)
Hayat al-qulub (book) by Mohammad-Baqer Majlesi (11th Century) (died 1699 AD)
 by Seyyed Hashem Bahrani (11th Century) (1640 AD - 1698 AD)
 by al-Sayyid  (11th Century)
Riyad al-abrar fi manaqib al-a'immat al-athar (book) by Nematollah Jazayeri (12th Century) (1640 AD - 1701 AD)
Jala' al-'uyun (book) by Mohammad-Baqer Majlesi (12th Century) (died 1699 AD)
 by Abbas Qomi (14th Century) (1877 AD - 1940 AD)
The Message — by Grand Ayatollah Ja'far Sobhani (15th Century) (1929 - Present)

Bibliography of Ahl al-Bayt 
List of books about Ahl al-Bayt

History and Biography 

 Manaqib Ale Abi Talib— by Abu Jafar Muhammad Ibn Ali Ibn Shahr Ashub (489-588 lunar/1096-1192)
 Encyclopedia of the Biography of Ahl Al-Bayt (English) (Arabic) (40 Vol.) by Baqir Sharif Al-Qurashi (1925 - 2012)
 Fatemeh is Fatemeh by Ali Shariati (1933 – 1977) (about Fatimah al-Zahra)

Genealogy 

 mudrik al talib fe nasb ale abi talib by syed qamar al araji (2017) (book of genealogy in Urdu language)

Shia-Sunni argumentations 
Al Muraja'at — by Abd al-Husayn Sharaf al-Din al-Musawi (1872 AD - 1957 AD)
 Peshawar Nights — by Sultanu'l-Wa'izin Shirazi (1894 AD - 1971 AD)
 Al-Ghadir — by Allamah Amini (1902 AD - 1970 AD) — (About the Hadith of Ghadir from Sunni books)
 The Role of Holy Imams (a.s.) in the Revival of Religion (Vol.1& Vol.2& Vol.3) — by Sayyid Murtadha al-'Askari (1914 AD - 2007)
 Imamate and Leadership  — by Mujtaba Musavi Lari (1925 AD – 2013 AD)
Then I was Guided (book) — by Muhammad al-Tijani (1943 AD - Present)
The Shi'ah are (the real) Ahl al-Sunnah (book) — by Muhammad al-Tijani (1943 AD - Present)
Ask Those Who Know (book) — by Muhammad al-Tijani (1943 AD - Present)
To be with the truthful (book) — by Muhammad al-Tijani (1943 AD - Present)
A Shi'ite Encyclopedia (book) — by Ahlul Bayt Digital Islamic Library Project (https://www.al-islam.org/)

Dua (Invocation) 
List of Supplications books
Al-Sahifa al-Sajjadiyya by Imam Zayn al-Abidin (a collection of Duas)
Mafatih al-Jinan by Shaykh 'Abbas Qummi (a collection of Duas)
Misbah ul Mutahajid by Shaykh Tusi (a collection of Duas)

Ethical 
List of Ethical books

See also
List of Sunni books
List of Islamic texts

References

Academic sources:
 Expectation of the Millennium: Shi'ism in History by Seyyed Hossein Nasr.
 Shi'ism Doctrines, Thought, and Spirituality by Seyyed Hossein Nasr.
 Introduction to Shi'i Islam by Moojan Momen, Yale University Press.
 An Introduction to Shi'i Law: A Bibliographical Study by Hossein Modarressi Tabataba'i (London 1984)
 Shi'ite Identities: Community and Culture in Changing Social Contexts by Christoph Marcinkowski (Berlin 2010).

External links

Online Shi'a references:
 Al-Islam.org Library
 Noor Library:
 Yasoob Library
 Shia Books Library
 Sipah-e-Masoomeen(as) Library

List
Islam-related lists
Lists of books about religion
Shia bibliography